Moga may refer to:

Acronyms
 Molybdopterin adenylyltransferase, an enzyme
 MOGA, the video game controller series by PowerA
 Modern girl, shortened to moga in Japanese
 Multi-objective genetic algorithm, an algorithm for multiple objective optimization

Geography
 Moga district, in Punjab, India
 Moga, Punjab, a city and municipality in the district
 Moga, Iran, a village in Hormozgan Province, Iran

People
 Moga, alternate name of the Indo-Scythian king Maues
 Moga inscription, an archaeological artifact found in the area of Taxila, Gandhara, Pakistan

Surname
Eva Moga (born 1968), Spanish alpine skier who competed in the 1988 Winter Olympics
Marius Moga (born 1981), Romanian music producer, composer, and singer
James Moga (born 1983), South Sudanese association football player (Indian I-League)
Sergiu Moga (born 1992), Romanian association football player (Liga I)
Tautau Moga (born 1993), Australian rugby league footballer (National Rugby League) of Samoan descent
Vasile Moga (1774–1845), Romanian bishop

See also
 Mogas (disambiguation)

Romanian-language surnames